Sundhari Kakka is a 1991 Indian Malayalam film, directed by Mahesh Soman and produced by V. Varghese. The film stars Sukumari, Innocent, Suresh Gopi and Manoj K. Jayan in the lead roles. The film has musical score by Ouseppachan and songs by Johnson.

Plot
Trouble erupts when a group of young men try to seduce a famous model, but a gang leader also lusts for her.

Cast

Rekha as Princy John
Rizabawa as Fa. Samuel Padamadan
Jagadish as Thomson
Prem Kumar as Johnson
Siddique as Nixon
Suresh Gopi as Peter Joseph
K. B. Ganesh Kumar as Roy Philip
Sukumari as Rosy
K. P. A. C. Lalitha as Eliyamma 
Philomina as Mariya
Karamana Janardanan Nair as Ouseppu Palamettathu
Innocent as Paily
K.P.A.C. Sunny as John Ousep Palamettathu
Thodupuzha Vasanthi as Mary John
Mamukkoya as Sulaiman
Kollam Thulasi as Joseph
Valsala Menon as Alice Joseph
Zainuddin - Cameo Appearance
Suvarna Mathew - Cameo Appearance
M. S. Thripunithura - Cameo Appearance
Manoj K. Jayan - Gangster

Soundtrack
The music was composed by Johnson and the lyrics were written by Kaithapram and Pradeep Ashtamichira.

References

External links

1991 films
1990s Malayalam-language films
Films scored by Johnson